Alexander Repenning  is the Director of the Scalable Game Design project, a computer science professor adjunct, a founder of AgentSheets Inc., and a member of the Center for Lifelong Learning and Design  at the University of Colorado in Boulder. Repenning is the inventor of drag and drop blocks programming. His research interests include computer science education, end-user programmable agents, human-computer interaction, and artificial intelligence.

Contributions 
Repenning is the creator of the AgentSheets and AgentCubes Cyberlearning tools used for game design and computational science applications. As the Director of the Scalable Game Design project, using AgentSheets, he leads an effort to reinvent computer science education in public schools through game design starting at the middle school level. With over 10,000 students, and with funding from the National Science Foundation (ITEST and CE21 programs) and Google, the Scalable Game Design project is conducting the largest US study  of computer science education at the middle school level including inner city schools, remote rural areas, and Native American communities. Results indicate that students, across genders and ethnicities, are not only highly motivated to learn computer science through game design but they also learn essential computational thinking skills. They acquire skills through game design, which later they can leverage in STEM simulation creation. Repenning's theoretical contributions include a pedagogical framework called the Zones of Proximal Flow  combining Vygotsky’s Zone of Proximal Development with Csikszentmihalyi’s state of Flow.

References 

Living people
American computer programmers
American computer scientists
University of Colorado Boulder alumni
Programming language designers
Year of birth missing (living people)